Bellastraea squamifera, the scaly star shell, is a species of sea snail, a marine gastropod mollusk in the family Turbinidae, the turban snails.

Description
The size of the shell varies between 15 mm and 30 mm.

Distribution
This marine species is endemic to Australia and occurs off New South Wales, South Australia, Tasmania, Victoria and Western Australia.

References

 Lamarck, J.B.P.A. de M. 1822. Histoire Naturelle des Animaux sans Vertèbres. Suite des Gastéropodes. Paris : J.B. Lamarck Vol. 6(2) 232 pp
 Philippi, R.A. 1844. Abbildungen und Beschreibungen neuer oder wenig gekannter Conchylien. Cassel : Theodor Fischer Vol. 1 pp. 77–204.
 Pritchard, G.B. & Gatliff, J.H. 1906. Catalogue of the Marine Shells of Victoria. Part IX. With complete index to the whole Catalogue. Proceedings of the Royal Society of Victoria 18(2): 39–92
 Iredale, T. 1924. Results from Roy Bell's molluscan collections. Proceedings of the Linnean Society of New South Wales 49(3): 179–279, pl. 33-36
 Cotton, B.C. 1945. Southern Australian Gastropoda. Part 1. Streptoneura. Transactions of the Royal Society of South Australia 69(1): 150–171
 Cotton, B.C. 1959. South Australian Mollusca. Archaeogastropoda. Handbook of the Flora and Fauna of South Australia. Adelaide : South Australian Government Printer 449 pp
 Macpherson, J.H. & Gabriel, C.J. 1962. Marine Molluscs of Victoria. Melbourne : Melbourne University Press & National Museum of Victoria 475 pp.
 Iredale, T. & McMichael, D.F. 1962. A reference list of the marine Mollusca of New South Wales. Memoirs of the Australian Museum 11: 1–109 
 Wilson, B. 1993. Australian Marine Shells. Prosobranch Gastropods. Kallaroo, Western Australia : Odyssey Publishing Vol. 1 408 pp
 Williams, S.T. (2007). Origins and diversification of Indo-West Pacific marine fauna: evolutionary history and biogeography of turban shells (Gastropoda, Turbinidae). Biological Journal of the Linnean Society, 2007, 92, 573–592
 Alf A. & Kreipl K. (2011) The family Turbinidae. Subfamilies Turbininae Rafinesque, 1815 and Prisogasterinae Hickman & McLean, 1990. In: G.T. Poppe & K. Groh (eds), A Conchological Iconography. Hackenheim: Conchbooks. pp. 1–82, pls 104–245.

External links
 

squamifera
Gastropods described in 1924